Sever Constantin Dron (born 25 June 1944) is a former professional tennis player and current coach.

After winning several junior national championships, he played for the Romanian Davis Cup team in 1969 and 1971, along Ilie Nastase and Ion Tiriac, among others.

A graduate of the Bucharest Sports Academy in 1966, he defected to France in 1972, requesting political asylum. There he became a coach, training among others, Virginia Ruzici, Henri Leconte and Julie Halard.

In 1989, he became a French citizen.

He is the founder of "Institut du Tennis Sever Dron" in France and "Tenis Club 2000 – Academia Sever Dron" in Romania.

Awards and honors
Honorary citizen of Melun, France
Silver and bronze medals by the French Tennis Federation

Book
Sever Dron, Am ales să fiu "nimeni" (I chose to be "nobody"), Pandora M, Bucharest, 2013

References

External links
 
 

1944 births
Romanian male tennis players
French tennis coaches
Romanian tennis coaches
Romanian defectors
Romanian expatriates in France
Living people
French male tennis players
Sportspeople from Melun